Brett Bailey (born June 28, 1994) is an American professional basketball player who last played for MZT Skopje of the Macedonian League. He played college basketball at San Diego Toreros (2013–2017)

Professional career
After graduating from San Diego Toreros, in 2017, he signed with Macedonian basketball club MZT Skopje. On November 7, 2017, he left MZT.

References

External links
aba-liga Profile
RealGM Profile
FoxSports Profile
ESPN Profile
SportsReference Profile

1994 births
Living people
ABA League players
American expatriate basketball people in North Macedonia
American men's basketball players
Basketball players from Spokane, Washington
KK MZT Skopje players
San Diego Toreros men's basketball players
Small forwards